Terence Patrick O'Neill  (30 July 1938 – 16 November 2019) was a British photographer, known for documenting the fashions, styles, and celebrities of the 1960s. O'Neill's photographs capture his subjects candidly or in unconventional settings.

His work has been featured in numerous exhibitions. He was awarded an honorary fellowship of the Royal Photographic Society in 2004 and the society's Centenary Medal in 2011. His work is held in the collection of the National Portrait Gallery, London.

Life and career
O'Neill was born to Irish parents in Romford, Essex, and began his career working in a photographic unit for an airline at London's Heathrow Airport. During this time, he photographed a sleeping figure in a waiting area who, by happenstance, was revealed to be Home Secretary Rab Butler. O'Neill thereafter found further employment on Fleet Street with The Daily Sketch in 1959. His first professional job was to photograph Laurence Olivier.

During the 1960s, in addition to photographing contemporary celebrities such as Judy Garland, the Beatles and the Rolling Stones, he also photographed members of the British royal family and prominent politicians, showing a more human side to these subjects than had usually been portrayed—his photographs capture his subjects candidly or in unconventional settings.

O'Neill's photographs of Elton John are among his best known. A selection of them appeared in the 2008 book Eltonography. Also considered among his most famous images are a series of American actress Faye Dunaway (his girlfriend at the time) at dawn on 29 March 1977, lounging next to the swimming pool at the Beverly Hills Hotel the morning after winning the Academy Award for Best Actress for Network, with several newspapers scattered around her and her Oscar statuette prominently shown on a table beside her breakfast tray. The series was photographed in both colour and black and white.

O'Neill was credited (as Terrence O'Neill) as an executive producer of the film Mommie Dearest (1981). His only other film credit was for still photography for the opera film Aria (1987).

Personal life
O'Neill was married to the actress Vera Day for 13 years; they had two children together, Keegan Alexander and Sarah Jane. He had a long-term relationship with Faye Dunaway; they were married for four years in the 1980s and had a son, Liam. In 2003, he was quoted in the U.S. tabloid magazine Star as saying Liam was adopted and not their biological son, contrary to Dunaway's public assertions. In 2001 O'Neill married Laraine Ashton, a former model agency executive.

O'Neill died on 16 November 2019 at his home in London from prostate cancer, at the age of 81.

Exhibitions
Terry O'Neill: Celebrity, National Portrait Gallery, London, 2003/4
Photographs by Terry O'Neill, San Francisco Art Exchange, San Francisco, CA, 2005
Kings and Queens: Photographs by Terry O'Neill, San Francisco Art Exchange, San Francisco, CA, 2007
Chairman of the Board, Knight of the Realm: Photographs of Frank Sinatra and Sir Elton John, San Francisco Art Exchange, San Francisco, CA, 2009
Getty Image Gallery, the Village, Westfield London, London, 2009. A retrospective.
Leeds Gallery, Munro House, Leeds, UK, 2011. A retrospective.
Terry O'Neill's Rock & Roll Opus, San Francisco Art Exchange, San Francisco, CA, 2014
Terry O'Neill: Stars, Fotografiska, Stockholm, 2022
Famous by Terry O'Neill, Fotomuseum aan het Vrijthof, Maastricht, 2023. Curated by Feiko Koster.

Books 
Legends. Jonathan Cape, 1985. 
Celebrity. Little, Brown, 2003. 
Sinatra: Frank and Friendly- A Unique Photographic Memoir of a Legend. Evans Mitchell, 2007. 
Eltonography: Sir Elton John a Life in Pictures. Evans Mitchell, 2008. 
All About Bond. Evans Mitchell, 2012. 
Terry O'Neill, 2013. 
Terry O'Neill's Rock 'n' Roll Album. ACC, 2014. 
Two Days That Rocked the World: Elton John Live at Dodger Stadium. ACC, 2015. 
Breaking Stones 1963–1965: A Band on the Brink of Superstardom. ACC, 2016. 
Terry O'Neill: Every Picture Tells a Story. ACC, 2016. 
When Ziggy Played The Marquee. ACC, 2017. 
Led Zeppelin Live : 1975–1977. ACC, 2018. 
Terry O'Neill: Rare & Unseen. ACC, 2018. 
Bowie by O'Neill: The definitive collection with unseen images. Cassell, 2019. 
Elton John by Terry O'Neill: The definitive portrait, with unseen images. Cassell, 2019. 
Always Audrey: Six Iconic Photographers. One Legendary Star. ACC, 2019.

Honours and awards
2004: Honorary Fellowship of the Royal Photographic Society
2011: Royal Photographic Society's Centenary Medal
2019: Appointed Commander of the Order of the British Empire (CBE) in the 2019 Birthday Honours for services to photography

Collections
National Portrait Gallery, London: 80 prints (as of July  2022 )

References

External links
"Photographer Terry O'Neill: a life in pictures" at The Guardian

National Museums Liverpool, article
Millenia Fine Art, article and photographs
BBC News — Terry O'Neill: Capturing celebrity

1938 births
2019 deaths
20th-century English artists
21st-century English artists
Commanders of the Order of the British Empire
Deaths from prostate cancer
Photographers from London
Fellows of the Royal Photographic Society
People from Romford
Deaths from cancer in England